Sylhet (Bengali: সিলেট) is a metropolitan city located in the northeastern region of  Bangladesh. It is the administrative center of Sylhet Division. It is situated on the banks of the Surma River and is surrounded by the Jaintiapur, Khasi Hills, and Tripura hills. The city has a population of approximately 700,000 people, making it the fifth-largest city in Bangladesh.

Sylhet is known for its tea plantations and natural beauty, and it is often referred to as the "tea capital" of Bangladesh. The city has a rich history that dates back to the 14th century, and it has been ruled by various dynasties and empires, including the Mughals, British, and the Nawabs of Bengal. The city is also home to several important landmarks, such as the Shah Jalal Shrine, which is one of the holiest sites in Bangladesh and attracts thousands of pilgrims every year. Other popular attractions include the Lakkatura Tea Garden, Wildlife Conservation Centre, and the Bongobir Osmani Shishu Uddan. Sylhet is a major commercial and financial center, and it is home to several multinational companies and industries, including the tea industry, which generates a significant amount of revenue for the city. The city also has a thriving tourism industry, with visitors coming from all over the world to explore its natural beauty and cultural heritage. Sylhet is also known for its vibrant music scene, and it is home to several renowned musicians and artists. The city has a rich literary tradition, and it has produced several notable writers and poets, including Syed Mujtaba Ali and Humayun Ahmed.

Furthermore, it is one of the most economically important cities after Dhaka and Chittagong. Sylhet is a fascinating city with a rich history, cultural heritage, and natural beauty. It is a hub of economic activity, tourism, and creativity. The city has a diverse population, with Bengalis, Tripuris, and other ethnic groups living together. The official language of Sylhet is Bengali, but English is widely spoken and understood because people from Sylhet form a significant portion of the Bangladeshi diaspora, particularly in the United Kingdom and the United States. According to The Daily Star, about 95% of Bangladeshi population in the UK comes from the sylhet district. Sylhet has a well-developed infrastructure, with a modern airport, railway station, and bus terminals that connect it to other parts of the country. The city also has several educational institutions, including Sylhet Agricultural University, Shahjalal University of Science and Technology, and Sylhet Cadet College.

Etymology and names
The city of Śrīhaṭṭa takes its name from Śrīhaṭṭanātha, the tutelary deity of  the Nātha dynasty who promoted the early settlement of Nāthas in the Surma and Barak valleys between the twelfth and thirteenth centuries, founding the Śrīhaṭṭa janapada and establishing Śrīhaṭṭanātha idols across the region. The later Hindu rajas of Sylhet, such as Gour Govinda, continued to pay tribute to the deity as Hāṭkeśvara or Haṭṭanātha as evident from the Devipurana and copper-plate inscriptions.

History 

In 1303, the Sultan of Lakhnauti Shamsuddin Firoz Shah conquered Sylhet by defeating Gour Govinda. Sylhet was a realm of the Bengal Sultanate. In the 16th-century, Sylhet was controlled by the Baro-Bhuyan zamindars and later became a sarkar (district) of the Mughal Empire. Sylhet emerged as the Mughals' most significant imperial outpost in the east, and its importance remained as such throughout the seventeenth century. British rule began in the 18th century under the administration of the East India Company. Sylhet became a key source of lascars in the British Empire with its ancient seafaring tradition. The Sylhet municipal board was established in 1867. Originally part of the Bengal Presidency and later Eastern Bengal and Assam; the town was part of Colonial Assam between 1874 and 1947 when following a referendum and the partition of British India, it became part of East Pakistan. The Sylhet City Corporation was constituted in 2001. The Government of Bangladesh designated Sylhet a metropolitan area in 2009.

Modern history
In 1995, the Government of Bangladesh declared Sylhet as the sixth divisional headquarters of the country. Sylhet has played a vital role in the Bangladeshi economy. Several of Bangladesh's finance ministers have been Members of Parliament from the city of Sylhet. Badar Uddin Ahmed Kamran was a longtime mayor of Sylhet. Humayun Rashid Choudhury, a diplomat from Sylhet, served as President of the UN General Assembly and Speaker of the Bangladesh National Parliament.

In 2001, the municipality was upgraded to the Sylhet City Corporation. It was made a metropolitan city in 2009.

Geography and climate 
Sylhet has a typical Bangladeshi tropical monsoon climate (Köppen Am) bordering on a humid subtropical climate (Cwa) at higher elevations. The rainy season starts from April to October and it is so hot and humid with very heavy showers and thunderstorms almost every day, whilst the short dry season starts from November to February and it is very warm and fairly clear. Nearly 80% of the annual average rainfall of  occurs between May and September.

The city is located within the region where there are hills and basins which constitute one of the most distinctive regions in Bangladesh. The physiography of Sylhet consists mainly of hill soils, encompassing a few large depressions known locally as "beels" which can be mainly classified as oxbow lakes, caused by tectonic subsidence primarily during the earthquake of 1762.

Geologically, the region is complex having diverse sacrificial geomorphology; high topography of Plio-Miocene age. Available limestone deposits in different parts of the region suggest that the whole area was under the ocean in the Oligo-Miocene. In the last 150 years three major earthquakes hit the city, at a magnitude of at least 7.5 on the Richter Scale, the last one took place in 1918, although many people are unaware that Sylhet lies on an earthquake prone zone.

Administration 

Sylhet is divided into 6 metropolitan thanas(police station) and consists of 27 wards and 224 mahallas. The thanas are:
 Bimanbandar Thana
 Kotwali Thana Google Maps
 Jalalabad Thana Google Maps
 Dakshin Surma Thana Google Maps
 Mogla Bazar Thana Google Maps
 Shah Paran Thana

It is a small city with an area of 26.50 km2. The rapid growth and expansion of Sylhet occurred during the colonial period. Sylhet Municipality was established in 1878. A devastating earthquake demolished almost the entire town on 12 June 1897 following which a modern and European model new town was built on the wreckage. Many new roads were constructed in the late 1890s and Sylhet became really connected to the other parts of the country with the establishment of an extension line of Assam Bengal Railway in 1912–15. From the beginning of the 20th century, the importance of Sylhet increased with the establishment of the tea industry. In the 1950s and 1960s, rapid urbanisation took place in the town, fostered by the expatriate Sylhetis and the process is still ongoing.

On 10 April 2001, Sylhet was changed to a city corporation from a municipal board, and currently the city is administrated by the Sylhet City Corporation. At present, Sylhet is the district-headquarters as well as the divisional headquarters of the districts of Sunamganj, Habiganj, Moulvibazar and Sylhet District. The Sylhet City Corporation is responsible for the services that are provided within the city which includes traffic, roads, garbage collection, water supply, registrations and many others. The corporation consists of the Mayor and 22 other commissioners, and focuses on the development of the city.

Military
Sylhet is strategically important for the Bangladesh Armed Forces. The Bangladesh Army's 17th Infantry Division is based at Jalalabad Cantonment in Sylhet. The cantonment is also home of the School of Infantry and Tactics (SI&T) and the 1st Para-commando Battalion, an elite commando unit of the Bangladesh Army.

Healthcare
Sylhet is also home to many hospitals that strategically provide healthcare to the community such as the Shahid Shamsuddin Hospital District Hospital, Sylhet MAG Osmani Medical College, Jalalabad Ragib-Rabeya Medical College, North East Medical College, Sylhet Women's Medical College, Parkview Medical College, Ibn Sina Hospital Sylhet Ltd, Noorjahan Hospital (pvt) Ltd, Oasis Hospital, Mount Adora Hospital, Square Medical Service, Popular Medical Service, Medinova Medical Service, Labaid Ltd and the Mohanagar Hospital as well as world's leading five star hospital such as the Al Haramain Hospital.

Recently a medical university called Sylhet Medical University has been established in the city. According to the Prime Minister's order to strictly monitor whether medical standards are being properly maintained in medical colleges, a medical university will be set up in each division. According to the order, Chittagong and Rajshahi Medical University have already been established. Sylhet Medical University is the 4th Medical University of the directive.

Demographics 

According to the 2011 Bangladesh census, the city had a population of 485,138. The population growth rate of the city is 1.73%, which has reduced from 1.93% in 1991.  Sylhet has a sex ratio of 861 females to 1000 males and a literacy rate of 67.8%. As of 2001, It had average literacy rate of 69.73%. The highest literacy rate was 84.24% in Ward 22 and the lowest was 48.15% in Ward 10 (2001). The total number of households was 97,991.

The majority of the population are Bengali Muslims of Sylheti background, while there are significant minority groups which includes the Bengali Hindus, Bishnupriya Manipuri and others. Sylheti is spoken by the vast majority of the people, while Standard Bengali is the official language used by the state government and officials.

The majority of Sylhetis are Muslims (87.3%), other religious groups include Hindus (12.5%) and less than 0.2% of other religions, mainly Buddhists and Christians. The majority of the Muslims are mainly Sunni Hanafis; and there are significant numbers of people who also follow Sufi ideals, the most influential are the teachings of Abdul Latif Fultali.

Economy 

The Sylhet Metropolitan Area is one of Bangladesh's main business centres. Sylhet's economy is closely linked with the Bangladeshi diaspora, especially the British Bangladeshi community. The city receives a significant portion of the country's annual remittances, which have driven growth in real estate and construction. A number of shopping centres, restaurants and hotels have opened as a result. Sylhet also relies on religious tourism, with thousands of devotees visiting its Sufi shrines annually, as well as ecotourism in its broader natural hinterland. Nature resorts have been built in the city's outskirts. Several important Bangladeshi companies are based in Sylhet, including Jalalabad Gas Transmission and Distribution, Sylhet Gas Fields and Alim Industries. Biman Bangladesh Airlines operates several flights from Sylhet to the United Kingdom and the Middle East. Roads connect Sylhet with the Indian states of Meghalaya and Assam.

Sylhet's hinterland plays a vital role in the economy of Bangladesh. It is home to the country's largest natural gas fields, sole crude oil field, largest tea plantations, rubber, palm oil, cane, agarwood and citrus farms. Rice production in the region is one of the country's highest. Heavy industries include power plants, fertilizer plants, cement plants and liquefied petroleum gas plants. Other major industries in the region include ceramics, machinery and equipment, ready-made garments and pharmaceuticals. Most of the tea production in Bangladesh is based around Sylhet, and the industry also has significant exports. The area is also known for producing oranges and other similar fruits. One of these fruit is called "Satkara" which is a variety of grapefruit that can be used in pickles and even as an ingredient in traditional Sylheti curry dishes.

Two Bangladeshi finance ministers from the city have been elected to the Jatiyo Sangshad: Saifur Rahman of the Bangladesh Nationalist Party and Abul Maal Abdul Muhith of the Awami League. The present foreign affairs minister DR. A K Abdul Momen who is younger brother of the former finance minister Abdul Muhith represents the Sylhet-1 seat in parliament.

Utility 
Sylhet has high rates of electric power shortage and water shortage. According to the Power Development Board, Sylhet is only receiving 50 MW, which is half of the required demand of 100 MW. The city corporation is also supplying only 22,500 gallons of water, far less than the demand of about 65,000. The major sources of water to the city is the tube wells and the Surma River. Tests of tube wells in Sylhet District by the Bangladesh University of Engineering and Technology in 1997 found that about 27.6% contained more arsenic than the acceptable limit set by Bangladesh of 50 micrograms per liter, and 49.2% contained more arsenic than the World Health Organization standard of 10 micrograms per liter. There are about 331 registered restaurants in the city, only 15% maintain sanitary facilities and 85% have unhygienic conditions that are unsafe for the public.

Sports 

Cricket is the most popular sport in Sylhet. Bangladesh Premier League franchise Sylhet Strikers are based in Sylhet International Cricket Stadium (M.A.G. Osmani Stadium), which was built in 2007 and has a capacity of 18,500 spectators. The Sylhet International Cricket Stadium was renovated in 2013 especially to host matches of 2014 ICC World Twenty20. It is situated near lush green tea gardens on the city fringe. In the National Cricket League Sylhet Division has not won any titles however did win in the One-Day Cricket League in 2001–02 season. Notable players from Sylhet who have played for the Bangladesh national cricket team include Rajin Saleh, Enamul Haque Jr, Tapash Baisya, and Alok Kapali. Chess player Rani Hamid was awarded the FIDE Women's International Master (WIM) title in 1985, while her son Kaiser Hamid was the captain of the Bangladesh national football team in the early 90s.

Transport 

The main transport systems used in the city are cycle rickshaws, auto rickshaws (mainly known as baby-taxis or CNGs), buses, mini-buses and cars. There are about 80,000 rickshaws running each day. Bus service prices have increased as of 2008, up to 30% higher, prices ranges from Tk 4 to 15.95.

The N2 is the national highway that connects the city with country's capital and largest city Dhaka as well as with many other parts of the country. The N2 highway is also part of AH1 and AH2- two longest routes of the Asian Highway Network.

Air
The city of Sylhet is served by Osmani International Airport, located at the north of the city. It is Bangladesh's third busiest airport and became an international airport due to the demand of expatriate Bangladeshis and their descendants from the United Kingdom and the United States. The main frequent airlines of the airport are Biman Bangladesh Airlines, US-Bangla Airlines and Novoair. The airport received its first international arrival on 3 November 2002, with Biman arriving from Kuwait via Abu Dhabi en route to Dhaka. Meanwhile, it received first direct international arrival on 15 March 2017 as a direct flight of Dubai based carrier Flydubai landed at the airport. Work started in 2006 to upgrade the airport to international standards, including a new terminal building, a jetway, a taxiway, and expansion of the runway to accommodate wide-bodied aircraft. It was confirmed that in May 2007, Biman will be operating Hajj flights directly from the airport later in 2007. Biman operates direct flight to London from Sylhet. All Bangladeshi airlines operate regular domestic flights to Dhaka and Biman operates regular domestic flights to Cox's Bazar. Government will construct a 34,919 square-metre high-quality international passenger terminal building, cargo building, control tower, parking, taxiway and other important infrastructures to meet the growing demand in line with the increase of passengers and cargo transportation at the airport.

Rail

The Sylhet Railway Station is the main railway station providing trains on national routes operated by the state-run Bangladesh Railway.
Some important train that origins/terminates :

Towards Dhaka

Towards Chittagong

Towards Akahura

Education 

There are two public universities in Sylhet: Shahjalal University of Science and Technology and Sylhet Agricultural University. There are some prominent colleges in Sylhet such as Jalalabad Cantonment Public School and College, MAG Osmani Medical College, Sylhet, Sylhet Women's Medical College, North East Medical College, Sylhet Engineering College, Sylhet Cadet College, Murari Chand College, Institute of Health Technology, Sylhet, Scholarshome, Blue Bird High School and College, Sylhet Science And Technology College and Sylhet Polytechnic Institute, Sylhet Government Women's College

Notable people

International relations
Sylhet had friendly relations with:
  St Albans, United Kingdom
  Rochdale, United Kingdom

The friendship link with St Albans was established in 1988 when the District council supported a housing project in Sylhet as part of the International Year of Shelter for the Homeless. Sylhet was chosen because it is the area of origin for the largest ethnic minority group in St Albans.

In March 2009, the Mayor of Sylhet, Badar Uddin Ahmed Kamran, signed a Memorandum of Understanding to form another friendship link between Sylhet and Rochdale, home to around 10,000 people with Sylhet heritage, with the Mayor of Rochdale Cllr Keith Swift at the Sylhet City Corporation.

See also 
 Sylheti language
 Sylheti Nagari
 Barak Valley

References

External links

Parabat Express
Official website of Sylhet City Corporation
Sylhet Tourist Places Video

 
Populated places in Sylhet District
Former capital cities in India